Martin "Jimmy" Scott (born 15 February 1986) is a Scottish professional footballer who is currently the manager of Gala Fairydean Rovers in the Lowland League.

Scott previously played for Livingston, Ross County, Hibernian, Raith Rovers, Arbroath, Stenhousemuir, Cowdenbeath, Cove Rangers, Brechin City, and Forfar Athletic. as well as Indian side Salgaocar.

Early life
He attended The James Young High School in Livingston, West Lothian.

Career

Livingston
Scott came through the youth system at his hometown club Livingston, before making his Scottish Premier League debut on 31 July 2005 in a 3–0 defeat by Rangers at Ibrox. In all he made 22 appearances in all competitions for Livingston before being released in the summer of 2006 after the club's relegation to the Scottish First Division.

Ross County
Scott then signed for Ross County. He scored the second goal for Ross County in their Scottish Cup semi final victory against Celtic at Hampden Park on 10 April 2010.

Hibernian
It was reported on 24 January 2011 that Hibernian had agreed a transfer fee of approximately £80,000 with Ross County to sign Scott. The deal was confirmed the next day. Scott was fined by Hibs in July 2011 for punching team-mate Sean Welsh during a training session, which resulted in Welsh needing an operation to repair a fractured cheekbone. He scored his first goals for the club in a 5–0 victory in the League Cup against Berwick Rangers in August 2011. Scott played infrequently under the management of Pat Fenlon, and was made available for loan in March 2012. Scott was loaned back to Ross County for the 2012–13 season.

Return to Livingston
On 26 July 2013, Scott re-signed for his former club Livingston on a one-year contract. He made his second debut for Livingston the following day in a Scottish Challenge Cup match against Berwick Rangers, before scoring his first goal on 3 August 2013 in a 3–1 win over Elgin City in the Scottish League Cup. On 15 February 2014, Scott scored the second goal in a 3–0 win over Alloa Athletic. The goal, a half volley from over 40 yards out, has had over 250,000 views on YouTube. He left the club in May 2014.

Raith Rovers
On 2 June 2014, Scott joined Scottish Championship side Raith Rovers On 29 May 2015, it was confirmed that Scott had left the club.

Salgaocar
Scott joined I-League side Salgaocar.

Return to Scotland
Scott returned to Scotland in July 2016, signing for Scottish League Two side Arbroath. Scott was released by the Red Lichties at the end of the season, having made thirty-two appearances and scoring ten goals. He subsequently signed for Stenhousemuir in June 2017.

Scott was released by Cowdenbeath and joined Cove Rangers in March 2019. After a spell with Brechin City, Scott joined Forfar Athletic in January 2021.

Gala Fairydean Rovers announced the signing of Scott on June 5 2021 as a player/coach. Scott took charge of Gala as the club's new manager on 9 January 2022 after Neil Hastings was offered a full-time role in football.

Honours
 Ross County
 Scottish Challenge Cup : 2006–07
Arbroath
 Scottish League Two : 2016–17
Cove Rangers
 Highland Football League : 2018–19 
 Highland League Cup : 2018–19

Career statistics

References

External links

Scotland U21 stats at Fitbastats

1986 births
Living people
Association football midfielders
Scottish footballers
Scottish Premier League players
Scottish Football League players
Livingston F.C. players
Ross County F.C. players
Hibernian F.C. players
Raith Rovers F.C. players
Arbroath F.C. players
Stenhousemuir F.C. players
Scotland under-21 international footballers
Sportspeople from Livingston, West Lothian
Footballers from West Lothian
Scottish Professional Football League players
Cowdenbeath F.C. players
Cove Rangers F.C. players
Brechin City F.C. players
Forfar Athletic F.C. players
Scottish football managers
Gala Fairydean Rovers F.C. managers
Lowland Football League managers